Simridong station is a railway station in Simridong-ri, Manp'o municipal city, Chagang Province, North Korea, on the Pukbunaeryuk Line of the Korean State Railway.

History
The station, originally called Oktong station, was opened in 1959 by the Korean State Railway, along with the rest of the original Unbong Line from Hyesan to Manp'o; much of this line was absorbed into the Pukpu Line in 1988.

References

Railway stations in North Korea